Red pepper may refer to:

Spices 
 Capsicum
 Chili powder, a finely ground mixture of dried chili peppers
 Crushed red pepper, a coarsely crushed mixture of dried chili peppers
 Chili pepper that is red, especially:
 Cayenne pepper
 Bell pepper, has various colors including red
 Red Savina pepper, a cultivar of the habanero chili
 Piper
 ripe black pepper

Other uses 
 Red Pepper (newspaper), a daily tabloid newspaper in Uganda
 Red Pepper (magazine), a "radical red and green" magazine based in the United Kingdom
 Red Peppers, a 1936 play by Noël Coward
 Redd Pepper (born 1961), voice artist who provides voice overs for movie trailers

See also
Pepper (disambiguation)